Geoff Dartt is an American college football coach. He is as the head football coach at the University of Mount Union in Alliance, Ohio, a position he has held since 2020.

Head coaching record

References

External links
 Mount Union profile

Year of birth missing (living people)
Living people
American football offensive linemen
Mount Union Purple Raiders football coaches
Wheaton Thunder football coaches
Western Kentucky Hilltoppers football coaches
People from Port Clinton, Ohio
Coaches of American football from Ohio
Players of American football from Ohio